"The Wild Ones" is the second single from the album Dog Man Star by English rock band Suede, released on 7 November 1994 through Nude Records. The song peaked at number 18 on the UK Singles Chart and number six in Iceland.

Background
The ballad is considered a favourite among fans and is one of their most notable songs of this period. Brett Anderson has said on numerous occasions that he regards this song as not only the high-water mark of his writing partnership with Bernard Butler, but his favourite of all Suede songs. The song is one of several notable Suede songs including "So Young" and "Stay Together", which were inspired by Anderson's ex-girlfriend Anick.

The B-side, "Modern Boys", appears as an album track in the US and Japanese editions of Dog Man Star. The single also features a version of "Introducing the Band" by electronic pioneer Brian Eno. Another B-side, "This World Needs a Father" is the only Suede song to feature input from both Bernard Butler and Richard Oakes. While the band were putting the final touches to the album, producer Ed Buller felt that the song needed more work and offered new guitarist Oakes to play Hammond organ.

Music video
"The Wild Ones" music video was filmed in Dartmoor and was directed by Howard Greenhalgh. The band met Greenhalgh at the MTV Video Music Awards in New York on a promo trip, where he won best video for Soundgarden's "Black Hole Sun". One of the band's few big-budget videos, it cost £150,000, most of it for computer special effects. Although Anderson is a fan of the song, he dislikes the music video. While promoting album Night Thoughts in 2016, he said: "That [video] really annoys me, because it's the greatest song Suede ever wrote, and it's got this awful video. It makes me shiver. That fucking video gives me night thoughts."

Reception and legacy
Music writer James Masterton was very favourable, writing: "Easily one of the greatest records the band will release in their entire career, The Wild Ones is a haunting ballad, sparsely produced and exploiting the quirks in Brett Anderson's voice to the full." Music & Media wrote: "For the first time, the Anderson assembly live up to their name. Semi-acoustic with violins and all, bad ass Brett recalls forgotten heroes like Ian McCulloch and Scott Walker." Linda Ryan of the Gavin Report felt the song marked a major change in the band's songwriting, by evoking classic country songwriters' tales of "what might've beens." She considered it a "more serious songwriting effort... a far cry from the tawdry lust that clung to many songs on the band's debut. Just beautiful." Steve Baltin of Cash Box felt the band had undergone a "metamorphosing" compared to the band's early work. As well as the early Bowie influence, he felt they incorporated the sound of U2, writing: "The band wears the changes well, creating a song that has more sustenance than previous works... the group deserve credit for credibly reinventing themselves." In reference to the band split during the summer, NME wrote: "Possibly the best song of the week... but this week, the band recorded here really no longer exists." Patrick Brennan of Hot Press was highly critical of the song. He wrote: "The only thing that saves this overblown farce is the understated and anti-melodic guitar playing of Bernard Butler. 'The Wild Ones' is infantile and ultimately meaningless, with a calculated teeny-bopper yearning, and even the orchestral arrangements of Brian Gascoigne, of Scott Walker's Climate of Hunter fame, can't save it. About as wild as a storm in a tea cup."

BBC America wrote a favourable retrospective review in 2008. Kevin Wicks said "[the song] is like a Britpop take on a mournful country-and-western tune. The lyrics are beautiful and poetic, and Anderson's low register has a Johnny Cash quality that is very expressive. Wonderful song." In 2014, NME ranked the song at number 370 on its list of the "500 Greatest Songs of All Time". Canadian rock band Destroyer, named their 2017 album ken after the song's original title.

Track listings
All songs were written by Brett Anderson and Bernard Butler except where noted.

UK CD1
 "The Wild Ones"
 "Modern Boys"
 "This World Needs a Father"

UK CD2
 "The Wild Ones"
 "Eno's Introducing the Band"
 "Asda Town" (Anderson)

UK 12-inch single
A. "The Wild Ones"
B. "Eno's Introducing the Band"

UK cassette single
 "The Wild Ones"
 "Modern Boys"

European CD single
 "The Wild Ones" – 4:50
 "Killing of a Flash Boy" – 4:07

Australian CD single
 "The Wild Ones"
 "Killing of a Flash Boy"
 "Whipsnade"

Charts

References

Bibliography
 

Suede (band) songs
1994 singles
1994 songs
Music videos directed by Howard Greenhalgh
Rock ballads
Song recordings produced by Ed Buller
Songs written by Bernard Butler
Songs written by Brett Anderson